Reyna Hernández (born 30 May 1998) is a Nicaraguan footballer who plays as a midfielder for UNAN Managua and the Nicaragua women's national team.

Club career
In August 2020, Hernández joined UNAN Managua.

International career
Hernández made her senior debut for Nicaragua on 8 April 2021 as a 77th-minute substitution in a 2–0 friendly away win over El Salvador.

References 

Living people
Nicaraguan women's footballers
Women's association football midfielders
Nicaragua women's international footballers
1998 births